The 1905 Howard Bulldogs football team was an American football team that represented Howard College (now known as the Samford University) as an independent during the 1905 college football season. In their first year under head coach Davis Stakely, the team compiled an 1–2–1 record.

Schedule

References

Howard
Samford Bulldogs football seasons
Howard Bulldogs football